William Malm (born March 6, 1928) is an American musicologist known for his studies of Japanese traditional music. As a composer, teacher, and scholar of Japanese music, Malm shaped the study of ethnomusicology in the United States. Malm authored the first major scholarly study in English of the history and instruments of Japanese music, Japanese Music and Musical Instruments (1959). He was a faculty member at the University of Michigan from 1960 to 1994. Malm served as president of the Society for Ethnomusicology from 1977 to 1979 and was named an Honorary Member of that organization in 2004. Malm was awarded the Fumio Koizumi Prize in 1992 for his contributions to the study of Japanese music. As the 2001 Charles Seeger Lecturer, Malm's address focused on the history and founding of ethnomusicology in the United States.

Biography 
Malm studied composition at Northwestern University, where he completed a Bachelor's in 1949 and a Master's in Music in 1950. He subsequently taught at the University of Illinois for a year. From 1951 to 1953, he was an instructor at the Naval School of Music. He completed the PhD in musicology at UCLA in 1959, where he also taught from 1958 to 1960. The bulk of his academic career was spent as a professor at the University of Michigan, where he taught from 1960 until 1994. At Michigan, he began an ethnomusicology program and worked with the Stearns Collection of Musical Instruments. His book Music Cultures of the Pacific, the Near East, and Asia (1967) is an authoritative and widely used textbook.

Malm made significant contributions to the study of Asian ethnomusicology, particularly his fieldwork and research into music for dance and Japanese music. His primary research area was the music of the shamisen, including music of traditional Japanese Kabuki theatre and Bunraku puppet theatre. Pete Seeger writes of attending a recital of Joruri (Bunraku music) with Malm in Tokyo in 1963 where Malm translated three long scenes for him. Seeger also accompanied Malm to his Joruri lesson where Malm sang and recited long passages with the teacher playing the samisen.

Malm's book on Nagauta (music of the Kabuki theatre), which grew out of his doctoral dissertation, is one of the first detailed studies of a single genre of Japanese music to be published in English. In 1986 in New York when the To-on-Kai ensemble from Japan presented the first professional performances in America of Nagauta performed separately from Kabuki theatre, Malm published an article in The New York Times about the art form.

Select publications 

 
 
 
 William P. Malm (1971), Introduction in Gagaku Court Music and Dance by Masataro Togi, New York & Tokyo: Walker/Weatherhill.

Honors
 Order of the Rising Sun, 3rd Class, Gold Rays with Neck Ribbon (2020)

References

External links 
 2001 Bibliography of Malm's writings

1928 births
University of Michigan faculty
American anthropologists
Cultural anthropologists
Ethnomusicologists
Living people
UCLA School of the Arts and Architecture alumni
People from La Grange, Illinois
Recipients of the Order of the Rising Sun, 3rd class
Northwestern University alumni
University of Illinois faculty